The Poet Laureate of Toronto is the city's literary ambassador and advocate for poetry, language and the arts. The poet laureate's mandate includes the creation of a legacy project that is unique to the individual. They also attend events across the city to promote and attract people to the literary arts.

Poets Laureate
2001-2004 - Dennis Lee
2004-2009 - Pier Giorgio Di Cicco
2009-2012 - Dionne Brand
2012-2015 - George Elliott Clarke
2015-2019 - Anne Michaels
2019-present - A. F. Moritz

References

External links
City of Toronto, Arts Heritage & Culture - Poet Laureate

Culture of Toronto
 
2001 establishments in Ontario
2001 in Toronto